The Western Australian Guineas is a Perth Racing Group 2 Thoroughbred horse race for three-year-olds at set weights run over a distance of 1600 metres at Ascot Racecourse, Perth, Western Australia in November. Total prize money is A$500,000.

History
The race was first held at Ascot racecourse on 15 November 1937, to mark the official date of the King's Birthday, as a weight-for-age mile race for three-year-olds. It was dropped from the race calendar in 1941 due to wartime economies. It was restored in 1943 and was run on the Saturday of the King's Birthday Meeting in November. In 2003 the race was run at Belmont Park Racecourse.

Grade
1937–1978 - Principal race
1978 onwards - Group 2

Distance
1937–1971 - 1 mile (1609 metres)
1972 onwards - 1600 metres

Winners

 2022 - Amelia's Jewel
 2021 - Treasured Star
 2020 - Watch Me Dance
 2019 - War Saint
 2018 - Arcadia Queen
 2017 - Perfect Jewel
 2016 - Variation
 2015 - Man Booker
 2014 - Rommel
 2013 - Ihtsahymn
 2012 - Academus
 2011 - King Saul
 2010 - Playing God
 2009 - Clueless Angel
 2008 - Moccasin Bend
 2007 - Megatic
 2006 - Vain Crusader
 2005 - Cape North
 2004 - Dr John
 2003 - River Mist
 2002 - The Right Money
 2001 - Royal Retrieve
 2000 - Kalatiara
 1999 - Devilish Dealer
 1998 - Old Nick
 1997 - Chelsea
 1996 - Summer Beau
 1995 - Bradson
 1994 - Tip The Pro
 1993 - El Cordero
 1992 - Classy Dresser
 1991 - Vows
 1990 - So Dashing
 1989 - Kaysart
 1988 - My Bobby Boo
 1987 - Tabharry
 1986 - Best Time
 1985 - Ever Ready
 1984 - Importune
 1983 - Storm Tide
 1982 - Rare Flyer
 1981 - Admiral Star
 1980 - Fortune Favours
 1979 - Star God
 1978 - Rare Sovereign
 1977 - Caduceus
 1976 - Blue Nucleus
 1975 - Ngawyni
 1974 - Gipsy Prince
 1973 - High Value
 1972 - Millefleurs
 1971 - Indian Shell
 1970 - Heliolight
 1969 - Kilrickle
 1968 - Beau Shar
 1967 - Super Sam
 1966 - Jolly Aster
 1965 - Baccare
 1964 - Rock Drill
 1963 - Norval Boy
 1962 - Nicopolis
 1961 - Water Power
 1960 - Chestillion
 1959 - Queen Of The May
 1958 - High Channel
 1957 - Emporium
 1956 - Fairflow
 1955 - Mallant
 1954 - Queen's Favourite
 1953 - Choya
 1952 - Raconteur
 1951 - Chestnut Lady
 1950 - Jovial Lad
 1949 - Prediction
 1948 - Jennie
 1947 - Westralian
 1946 - Chieftain Warrior
 1945 - Cherbourg
 1944 - Lord Treat
 1943 - Kingsley
 1942 - race not held
 1941 - race not held
 1940 - Romanette
 1939 - True Flight
 1938 - Gay Prince
 1937 - Footmark

See also

 List of Australian Group races
 Group races

References

Horse races in Australia
Sport in Perth, Western Australia